Ismat Ismayil oglu Gayibov (born in 1942 in Ganja, Azerbaijan) was the Public Prosecutor General of Azerbaijan.   

He was killed in a helicopter which was shot down by Armenian forces near the Karakend village of Khojavend district in Nagorno-Karabakh, Azerbaijan. There were no survivors of the crash.

Gayibov's official burial was done at the Avenue of the Honored Ones Cemetery in Baku. A stadium in Baku, an oil tanker, many schools and streets were named after him.

See also
1991 Azerbaijani Mil Mi-8 shootdown
Ismat Gayibov Stadium

References

1942 births
1991 deaths
Political office-holders in Azerbaijan
Prosecutors General of Azerbaijan
Prosecutors of the Azerbaijan Soviet Socialist Republic
20th-century Azerbaijani lawyers
Victims of aircraft shootdowns
Jurists from Ganja, Azerbaijan